Trevor Cooper (born 21 September 1953) is an English actor.

Background
Born 21 September 1953, Cooper studied law at Kingston Polytechnic and graduated with a master's degree in law from the University of Warwick. He taught for two years at London South Bank University before becoming an actor training at the Drama Studio London. He is known for portraying, in his words, "bald fat blokes".

Career
Having won a Carleton Hobbs Award in 1979, Cooper had his first lead role in a 1980 radio production of The File on Leo Kaplan. Cooper appeared in the films The Whistle Blower and The Ruby in the Smoke. He is also known for playing Colin Devis on the television series Star Cops and Gurth in the 1997 BBC dramatisation of Ivanhoe. His other television roles include appearances in Our Friends in the North, Outnumbered, Ballot Monkeys, Doctor Who: Revelation of the Daleks, Doctors, Kingdom, Trial & Retribution, The Bill, Spooks,  Vikings , Casualty, Wizards vs Aliens, The Wrong Mans and Inside No. 9 ("The Trial of Elizabeth Gadge"). He has also worked on the Kaldor City series of audio plays, and had a part in Chimerica at the Harold Pinter Theatre 2013.

In 2014, Cooper portrayed Simeon Swann in the third series of the CBBC science-fantasy series Wizards vs Aliens. Cooper starred alongside his brother Paul in the 2017 BBC Three mockumentary, This Country. The show also starred, and was written and created by, his niece and nephew, Daisy May and Charlie Cooper.

From 2017-2020, Cooper portrayed Sergeant Aubrey Woolf in the BBC One drama, Call the Midwife, leaving after the second episode in Series 9.

References

External links
 
Trevor Cooper at BFI

1953 births
Living people
English male film actors
Male actors from London
Alumni of Kingston University
Alumni of the University of Warwick
Alumni of the Drama Studio London
Academics of London South Bank University
English male television actors
English male voice actors
20th-century English male actors
21st-century English male actors